Hajji Taqi (also Romanized as Ḩājjī Taqī; also known as Qal‘eh-ye Hājītaqī, Qal‘eh-ye Ḩājjī Taqī, and Qal‘eh Ḩājī Taqī) is a village in northeastern Iran, located in Titkanlu Rural District, Khabushan District, Faruj County, North Khorasan Province. At the 2006 census, its population was 882, in 219 families.

References 

Populated places in Faruj County